Os Maiores Sucessos (Greatest Hits) is a collection of the former Banda Calypso

It is the first collection of the band that contains the successes of the first three albums: Volume 1, Ao Vivo e O Ritmo Que Conquistou o Brasil!. Tracks like "Temporal", "Dançando Calypso", "Cúmbia do Amor", "Estrela Dourada" and "Disse Adeus" They make up the album, which also features the tracks "Mil e Uma Noites" e "Sem Medo de Falar".

Tracks 
 "Dançando Calypso"
 "Príncipe Encantando"
 "Estrela Dourada"
 "Odalisca"
 "Vendaval"
 "Cúmbia do Amor"
 "Esperando por Você"
 "Dudu"
 "Só Vai Dar Eu e Você"
 "Senhorita"
 "Sem Medo de Falar"
 "Mil e Uma Noites"
 "Fórmula Mágica"
 "Maridos e Esposas"
 "Como Uma Virgem"
 "Disse Adeus"

References

2003 compilation albums
Banda Calypso albums